Walcott may refer to:

People
 Walcott (surname)

Places  
England
 Walcott, Lincolnshire
 Walcott, Norfolk

United States
 Walcott, Arkansas
 Walcott, Iowa
 Walcott, North Dakota
 Walcott, Wyoming

See also 
 Walcot, Lincolnshire
 de Walcott family
 Walcot (disambiguation)
 Wolcott (disambiguation)
 Walcote (disambiguation)
 "Walcott", a song by Vampire Weekend from their 2008 self-titled album